The Battle of Araviana was a cavalry action fought during the War of the Two Peters on 22 September 1359. Eight hundred Aragonese horse, many of them Castilian exiles in service of the Crown of Aragon under Henry of Trastámara, had launched a cavalgada in Castilian territory when, near the Castilian town of Ágreda, confronted and routed a Castilian force under Juan Fernández de Henestrosa set to guard the frontier. Numerous Castilian noblemen and knights were killed, including Henestrosa, while many other were captured.

Background 
The War of the Two Peters broke in 1356 when a squadron of 9 Catalan galleys under Francesc de Perellós sent by the king Peter IV of Argon to assist the House of Valois in their succession conflict with the House of Plantagenet, captured near Sanlúcar de Barrameda two ships under the flag of the Republic of Genoa, at that time engaged in a war against the Republic of Venice and the Crown of Aragon. The king Peter I of Castile, who was present at Sanlúcar during the event, feel offended and demanded Perellós the free of the Genoese vessels.

Perellós refused Peter's demands and was therefore chased by Castilian warships till the Portuguese coast. Peter of Castile complained afterwards to the king Peter IV Aragon, but as he did not obtained the desired results, he declared war on the Crown of Aragon. He promptly began the operations besieging by sea the Valencian town of Guardamar, unsuccessfully, and launching some cavalgadas through the frontier. In 1359 the Castilian fleet raided the Valencian and Catalan coasts, not obtaining satisfying results but menacing the town of Alicante. Peter IV, seeing that his southern frontier was in danger, dispatched several horse companies led by Pere de Xèrica to defend the area around Orihuela, Crevillente and Elche, and also ordered all the fortresses to be provisioned with enough ammunitions and supplies.

Battle 
Over the following months the action displaced to the Aragonese border with Castille. In September, Henry of Trastámara, pretender to the Castilian throne and half-broder and rival of Peter I, together with his younger brother Tello and several members of the Aragonese House of Luna, as Pedro, Juan Martínez and Fray Artal de Luna, launched a raid in Castilian territory invading the country near the town of Almazán. This force consisting of about 800 horse, encountered a considerable larger Castilian company of 1,500 horse led by the uncle of Peter I, Juan Fernández de Henestrosa. Refusing to run for cover, Henry offered battle near Ágreda. The fought which ensued was a brief affair and concluded with the routing of the Castilian force. Among those Castilians who were killed were found Juan Fernández de Henestrosa.

Other signaled casualties were Gomez Suárez de Figueroa, Fernando García Duque, Pedro Bermúdez, Gonzalo Sánchez de Ulloa and Juan González de Bahabon. Many noblemen and knights as Iñigo López de Orozco, Fernando Rodríguez de Villalobos, Juan Gómez de Bahabon, Hurtado Díaz de Mendoza and Díaz Sánchez de Porra, all of them Knights of the Band, were captured. Also the Castilian banner was taken when his bearer, Gonzalo Sánchez de Ulloa, was killed.

Aftermath 
Peter I was informed of the defeat of his armies at his arrival on Seville from the Valencian coast. The Aragonese armies won another victory shortly after at Tarazon, but a few months later, in the spring of 1360, Henry was defeated by Peter I himself at the so-called First Battle of Nájera. On this occasion Henry was supported by 1,200 cavalry and 2,000 cavalry, while Peter had a much larger army of 5,000 cavalry and 10,000 infantry. Though Peter won the first day he decided to withdraw and Henry was able to continue offering battle. However, Castille took the initiative and focused the operations at the southern Valencian frontier. The town of Orihuela was subsequently raided by 800 Castilian and Moor cavalry, but a relief force of 250 horse led by Count Alfons of Ribagorza and Denia dispersed them and recovered the lost ground.

References

Bibliography 

Araviana
Araviana
Araviana
Araviana
1359 in Europe
14th century in Castile